The following list is of all 86 stations on the Frankfurt U-Bahn.


Legend
Boldface: Terminus station

List

References

External links 
 

Frankfurt
Frankfurt U-Bahn
Transport in Frankfurt
Frankfurt U-Bahn
Rail